The puna snipe (Gallinago andina) is a bird in tribe Scolopancinai and subfamily Scolopacinae of family Scolopacidae, the sandpipers and relatives. It is found in Argentina, Bolivia, Chile, and Peru.

Taxonomy and systematics

The taxonomic history of the New World snipes of genus Gallinago is complicated. What is now the puna snipe has in the past been treated as a subspecies of common snipe (G. gallinago) with what are now the Pantanal snipe (G. paraguaiae) and the Magellanic snipe (G. magellanica). After the puna snipe was recognized as a species, the Pantanal and Magellanic snipes were sometimes treated as subspecies of it. By about the year 2000 all three were beginning to be recognized as individual species by most taxonomic systems. The current (2022) puna snipe has two subspecies, the nominate G. a. andina (Taczanowski, 1875) and G. a. innotata (Hellmayr, 1932).

Description

The sexes are alike. Their upperparts have a complex pattern of muted whitish, buffy, rufous, black, and brown. White trailing edges to their wings show when in flight. Their breast and flanks are buff with black markings and the rest of their underparts white. Their white face has a bold brown stripe through the eye.

Distribution and habitat

The nominate subspecies of puna snipe is found in the Andes of Peru, northern Chile, Bolivia, and northwestern Argentina. Undocumented sight records in Ecuador lead the South American Classification Committee of the American Ornithological Society to class it as hypothetical in that country. Subspecies G. a. innotata is found only in northern Chiles's Antofagasta Region.

The puna snipe inhabits the puna grassland zone of the Andes. It favors damp to wet landscapes such as boggy rivers, cushion plant bogs, the reedy edges of ponds, lakes, and rivers, and sometimes open reed marshes.

Behavior

Movement

Some members of the Argentinian population of the puna snipe's nominate subspecies move east onto the pampas during the austral winter. Those in Chile and Peru appear to also move lower but not as dramatically. Movements of G. a. innotata, if any, are not known.

Feeding

The puna snipe's feeding behavior and diet have not been studied. Both are assumed to be similar to those of other South American Gallinago snipes, which forage for insect larvae and earthworms by probing mud and wet soil.

Breeding

The puna snipe's breeding season varies geographically. It is mostly between October and December in Peru and includes at least September in northern Chile. The male performs a winnowing display during courtship, flying high in circles and then taking shallow dives to produce a distinctive sound. Nothing else is known about its breeding biology.

Vocal and non-vocal sounds

The puna snipe sings from the ground "a fast-paced but mellow-sounding 'tip-tip-tip-tip...', 'cut-cut-cut-cut...' or 'dyak dyak dyak .... dyuc dyuc dyuc...'". When taking flight it makes "a sharp, dry 'chep chep chep!', 'che’che’che' or 'dzeetch'". The species' non-vocal winnowing is made by air flowing over the outer tail feathers during flight. It is described as "a long, stuttering whoosh, rendered 'tch’ch’ch’ch’".

Status

The IUCN has assessed the puna snipe as being of Least Concern. It has a fairly large range, and though its population size is not known it is believed to be stable. No immediate threats have been identified. It is considered fairly common in Peru and uncommon in Chile.

References

Puna snipe
Birds of the Puna grassland
Puna snipe
Puna snipe